This is a list of mayors of Kenosha, Wisconsin, also known as the Village of "Southport" until 1850.

Village presidents (1841–1850)
The City of Kenosha was incorporated from the area previously known as the Village of Southport in 1850.

Mayors (1850–1922)
In 1850, Kenosha was incorporated as a city using the Mayor-Aldermanic system of government with officeholders to be elected in an 1850 general election.

City managers (1922–1958)
In 1921, Kenosha elected to move to a council-manager style government where the chief executive and administrator was a city manager elected by the city commissioners.

Mayors (1958–present)
In 1957, Kenosha elected to return to a Mayor-Aldermanic system of government with officeholders to be elected in April 1958 general elections.

See also
 Kenosha, Wisconsin
 Kenosha County, Wisconsin

References

Further reading

External links
 City of Kenosha
 Kenosha County

Kenosha
 list